Mohinder is an Indian male name, possibly a variant of Mahendra. Among the people named Mohinder are:

Mohinder Amarnath, Indian cricketer
Mohinder Lal, Indian hockey player
Mohinder Pratap Chand, Indian poet
Mohinder Purba (a.k.a. Deep Roy), Kenyan actor
Mohinder Saran, Canadian politician
Mohinder Singh, Indian triple jumper born 1934
Mohinder Singh Dhoni, Indian cricketeer
Mohinder Singh Gill, Indian triple jumper born 1947
Mohinder Singh Kaypee, Indian politician
Mohinder Singh (middle distance runner), Indian winner of the 1500 metres at the 1962 Asian Games
Mohinder Singh Pandher, Indian serial murder victim
Mohinder Singh Pujji, Indian RAF Fighter pilot in World War II
Mohinder Singh Randhawa, Indian art historian
Mohinder Singh Sarna (aka S. Mohinder), Indian film score composer
Mohinder Suresh, fictional character in the U.S. TV series Heroes, portrayed by Sendhil Ramamurthy

See also
Mohinder (band), an American post-hardcore band